Harira ( al-ḥarīra) is a traditional North African soup prepared in Morocco and Algeria. Algerian harira differs from Moroccan harira in that Algerian harira does not contain lentils. It is popular as a starter but is also eaten on its own as a light snack. There are many variations and it is mostly served during Ramadan, although it can be made throughout the year.

It is also part of the Maghrebi cuisine, where lemon juice and egg is added to brighten the flavors of the soup. Like Muslims, who traditionally have the filling soup for Iftar meals, Jews break their fast with it during Yom Kippur.

Preparation

Harira's base recipe is composed of the following ingredients, and may vary depending on regions:

Tadouira - a thickening mixture made from flour and water and sometimes canned tomato paste, which is added at the end of the cooking process.
tomatoes and tomato concentrate
lentils
chickpeas
fava beans
onions
rice
beaten eggs
small amount of meat: (beef, lamb or chicken)
a spoon or two of olive oil.

The stock, usually lamb, is well-seasoned with cinnamon, ginger, turmeric or another coloring agent like saffron, and fresh herbs such as cilantro and parsley.

Lemon juice can also be added at serving time. The soup tastes best if it has been allowed to rest overnight.

It is usually served with hard-boiled eggs sprinkled with salt and cumin, dates and other favorite dried fruits like figs, traditional honey sweets and other homemade special breads or crepes.

See also
 List of African dishes
 Moroccan cuisine
 Algerian cuisine
 Maghrebi cuisine
 List of soups

References

External links

Recipe for harira by Robert Carrier at the BBC's Good Food Guide

Soups
Moroccan soups
Arab cuisine
Mediterranean cuisine
African cuisine
Iftar foods
Sephardi Jewish cuisine
Yom Kippur
Middle Eastern cuisine
Algerian cuisine
Maghrebi cuisine